Connecticut's 133rd House of Representatives district elects one member of the Connecticut House of Representatives. It encompasses parts of Fairfield and has been represented by Democrat Cristin McCarthy Vahey since 2015.

Recent elections

2020

2018

2016

2014

2012

References

133